Saint-Gabriel-de-Valcartier is a municipality in the Capitale-Nationale region of Quebec, Canada, located in the Jacques-Cartier River valley. It is home to the Canadian Forces Base Valcartier since World War I.

History
In 1647, Robert Giffard de Moncel was granted the Saint-Gabriel seignory that became property of the Jesuits in 1667 and Crown property in 1800. Around 1816, John Neilson (1776-1848), together with Andrew Stuart and Louis Moquin, Quebec lawyers, obtained some 50 concessions in the Saint-Gabriel seignory. This marked the start of the Val-Cartier settlement that was intended to receive Irish and Scottish colonizers.

In 1832, the Parish of Saint-Gabriel-de-Valcartier was formed when it was detached from Sainte-Catherine(-de-la-Jacques-Cartier) and Charlesbourg. In 1845, the Municipality of Valcartier was created in 1845 but abolished in 1847. The Parish Municipality of Saint-Gabriel-de-Valcartier was officially established in 1855, then divided in 1862 into two municipalities: Saint-Gabriel-Ouest and Saint-Gabriel-de-Valcartier.

In 1985, Saint-Gabriel-Ouest and Saint-Gabriel-de-Valcartier were merged again to form the current municipality.

Demography

Population

Private dwellings occupied by usual residents: 1,124 (total dwellings: 1,204)

List of mayors

Mayors of Saint-Gabriel-Ouest
 1878-1881 : Patrick Cosgrove
 1881-1882 : Ulric Gauvreau
 1882-1884 : Thomas Brown
 1884-1887 : James Burns
 1887-1890 : Thomas Brown
 1890-1895 : Samuel Clark
 1895-1903 : Thomas Brown
 1903-1909 : Lawrence Corrigan
 1909-1911 : James Bowles
 1911-1924 : Robert Hayes
 1924-1930 : Thomas Knox
 1931-1932 : Thomas Murphy
 1932-1933 : James Clark
 1933 : Albert Corrigan
 1933-1941 : John Murphy
 1941-1946 : John McCartney
 1947-1955 : Cecil Rourke
 1955-1961 : Simmons Crawford
 1961-1967 : George Murphy
 1967-1971 : John McCartney
 1972-1985 : Donat Rouleau

Mayors of Saint-Gabriel-de-Valcartier
 1878-1880 : Arthur Wolff (family of Lt. Colonel Alexander Joseph Wolff).
 1881 : Thomas Dacres
 1882 : William B. McBain
 1883 : Francis Ireland
 1884-1885 : William B. McBain
 1886-1888 : Thomas Dacres
 1889 : David B. McCartney
 1890 : Charles Jack
 1891-1896 : John McBain
 1896-1903 : William B. McBain
 1903-1905 : Lewis McBain
 1905-1906 : Thomas Knox
 1906-1908 : Andrew Brown
 1908-1914 : Thomas Knox
 1914-1923 : John McCartney
 1923-1924 : William Neil
 1924-1927 : Robert Goodfellow
 1927-1936 : Alfred J. Hicks
 1937-1940 : William Goodfellow
 1941-1946 : Irvin Jack
 1947-1948 : William Hicks
 1949-1950 : Neilson McBain
 1951-1961 : William Hicks
 1961-1969 : Russel Paquet
 1969-1988 : Lewis Jack
 1988- : Brent Montgomery

Climate

See also
List of municipalities in Quebec

References

External links

Incorporated places in Capitale-Nationale
Municipalities in Quebec